Faros beach (in Greek: Παραλία του Φάρου), is situated in the locality of Larnaca, Cyprus, specifically in the village of Pervolia. The beach is sandy with a very wild and resistant to the sun vegetation around the beach. The sea of this bay is a crystal blue and with significant fish life. The beach attracts a significant number of tourists due to its accessibility from Larnaca International Airport. At the beach there are a number of water sports, cantinas and a small volley beach court.

At Faros Bay one finds a good number of boat houses, that are used by the Cypriots as summer residences. The Cypriot Government has had a patchy history of enforcing its regulations against private encroachment on public land.

Gallery

Beaches of Cyprus
Tourism in Cyprus